Dmytro Oleksandrovych Ivanisenya (born 11 January 1994) is a Ukrainian professional footballer who plays as a defensive midfielder for Krylia Sovetov Samara.

Club career

Early years
Ivanisenya is a product of the Kryvbas Kryvyi Rih, Metalurh Zaporizhzhia, and Shakhtar Donetsk academies.

Illichivets Mariupol
In July 2015 he was loaned to the Ukrainian First League club Illichivets Mariupol.

Krylia Sovetov Samara
On 6 July 2021, he signed a three-year contract with Russian Premier League club Krylia Sovetov Samara.

Career statistics

References

External links
 
 

1994 births
Sportspeople from Kryvyi Rih
Living people
Ukrainian footballers
Ukraine youth international footballers
Ukraine under-21 international footballers
Ukraine international footballers
Association football midfielders
FC Shakhtar Donetsk players
FC Shakhtar-3 Donetsk players
FC Mariupol players
FC Illichivets-2 Mariupol players
FC Dinamo Tbilisi players
FC Zorya Luhansk players
PFC Krylia Sovetov Samara players
Ukrainian Second League players
Ukrainian First League players
Ukrainian Premier League players
Erovnuli Liga players
Russian Premier League players
Ukrainian expatriate footballers
Expatriate footballers in Georgia (country)
Ukrainian expatriate sportspeople in Georgia (country)
Expatriate footballers in Russia
Ukrainian expatriate sportspeople in Russia